Asha Haji Elmi (born 1962) is a Somali politician and peace activist. As of August 2012, she is a former member of the Federal Parliament of Somalia.

Background
Elmi was born in 1962 in Somalia. She hails from the Saleebaan sub-clan of the Habar Gidir.

For her post-secondary education, Elmi earned a degree in economics from the Somali National University. She also holds a Master of Business Administration from the US International University.

Elmi is married to Abdi Farah Shirdon Saaid, a prominent entrepreneur and the former Prime Minister of Somalia.

Career

Peace activism
In the 2000s, Elmi formed the Sixth Clan women's movement to advance female participation in Somali politics. She was later selected to the Transitional Federal Parliament (TFP) on August 29, 2004, and served until 2009.

Elmi is also the founder of Save Somali Women and Children (SSWC), created in 1992 during the height of the Somali Civil War.

Additionally, Asha has been acknowledged internationally for her activism against female circumcision (FGC) in Somalia and in other areas. She frequently travels to college campuses and universities around the world giving speeches about local political conditions and the effects of FGC.

Federal Parliament
In August 2012, Elmi was selected as a legislator in the Federal Parliament of Somalia.

Awards
Elmi has received numerous awards for her peace work. In 2008, she became a recipient of the Right Livelihood Award "for continuing to lead at great personal risk the female participation in the peace and reconciliation process in her war-ravaged country". In September 2009, she was also among five nominees that were presented the Clinton Global Citizen Award.

References

External links

 WAPPP Fellow, profile at Kennedy School of Government, Harvard University
 2009 Clinton Global Citizen Award Honorees Announced by President Clinton
 Biography on Right Livelihood Award

1962 births
Living people
Members of the Federal Parliament of Somalia
Somalian feminists
Somalian women's rights activists
Somali National University alumni
21st-century Somalian women politicians
21st-century Somalian politicians